A. Harsha  (born 24 August 1980) is an Indian Film director and choreographer who works in Kannada cinema. Harsha has choreographed many popular songs.

Early life

Harsha was born in Bengaluru, Karnataka, to Poornima and Ashok. He studied at Sri Kumaran Children's Home and Holy Saint English School. He did his Automobile diploma in Oxford College, Bengaluru.

Career
Harsha entered movie industry when he acted in movie Kashi from Village, as the brother of Kichha Sudeep and has since completed 300 dance sequences as choreographer. Harsha managed the entire event and choreographed the audio launch function of Nikhil Kumar's debut film, Jaguar.

Choreographer 
Harsha debuted in KFI as a choreographer for the movie Ranga S.S.L.C in 2004. Harsha earned a lot of recognition when he choreographed the songs for Mungaaru Male. He has since choreographed for many popular movies, including Meravanige and Moggina Manasu, Rishi, Taj Mahal, Only Vishnuvardhana.

Director 
Harsha made his directorial debut with Geleya in 2007, starring Prajwal Devraj and Tarun. involving the underworld. Harsha was appreciated for the freshness of the film, its making and was average at Box Office. 
Harsha took up direction again with Birugaali in 2009, this time including Chetan of Aa Dinagalu fame and casting his wife Sitara Vaidya. This movie opened to poor reviews despite melodious songs.

Harsha's 2012 film was Chingari starring  Darshan was a remake of English movie Taken.

His 2013 film Bhajarangi featuring Shivarajkumar was a huge success at the box-office. He followed it up with similar script and same cast in Vajrakaya, which released in 2015 and was an average hit.

Released in 2016, Jai Maruti 800 was panned by critics for following same storyline as Bhajarangi or Vajrakaya. As per Deccan Chronicle, "Anyone who has so far seen this director's previous 'commercial' hits 'Bhajarangi' and 'Vajrakaya' can easily predict what 'Jai Maruti 800' is all about. With no creative mind set, and banking heavily upon his narrative style from the previous 'commercially' successful films and off course leaving it to his favourite God - the ingredients remains the same but packed with a new label - comedy."

In 2017, Harsha announced Kapicheshte starring his assistant Mohan, but the movie was never completed after initial shoots.

Harsha followed with two remakes Anjani Putra, which received mixed reviews even with Puneet Rajkumar in lead, and Seetharama Kalyana, which was a flop.

In October 2017, Harsha announced "Raana" with Yash amidst much fanfare. But Yash was not too happy with the script that Harsha had presented to him. Sources add that when Harsha presented the actor with the complete script, he wasn't too happy and had reportedly told the director to fine-tune it to meet his approval standards. Further, with the director's track record not being up to scratch, Yash's well-wishers reportedly advised him to put Raana in cold storage for the time being. Harsha replaced Yash with Shivrajkumar in the movie and eventually, renamed the movie as "Bhajarangi 2"

After release of the teaser, A Harsha confirmed that Bhajarangi 2 will be released in Telugu language and possibly in other languages as well.

Harsha has also announced release of his fourth movie with Shiva Raj kumar, which will be a departure from his usual title references and storyline. This movie will be Shiva Raj kumar's 125th movie and titled "Vedha".

Alongside Vedha, A Harsha and Dhruva Sarja are also in talks for a movie.

Filmography

As director

Actor
Kashi from Village (2005)
Jackpot (2006)

Television

Partial choreography
 Ranga ajay m SSLC (2004)
 Rishi (2005)
 Mungaru Male (2006)
 Meravanige (2008)
 Moggina Manasu (2008)
 Taj Mahal (2008)
 Vishnuvardhana (2011)
 Bahaddur (2014)
 Bengal Tiger (2015)
 Hebbuli (2017)
 Bharjari (2017)

References

Indian film choreographers
Year of birth missing (living people)